C++17 is a version of the ISO/IEC 14882 standard for the C++ programming language. C++17 replaced the prior version of the C++ standard, called C++14, and was later replaced by C++20.

History
Before the C++ Standards Committee fixed a 3-year release cycle, C++17's release date was uncertain. In that time period, the C++17 revision was also called C++1z, following C++0x or C++1x for C++11 and C++1y for C++14. The C++17 specification reached the Draft International Standard (DIS) stage in March 2017. This DIS was unanimously approved, with only editorial comments, and the final standard was published in December 2017. Few changes were made to the C++ Standard Template Library, although some algorithms in the <algorithm> header were given support for explicit parallelization and some syntactic enhancements were made.

New features
C++17 introduced many new features. The following lists may be incomplete.

Language
 Making the text message for  optional
 Allow  (as an alternative to ) in a template template parameter
 New rules for  deduction from braced-init-list
 Nested namespace definitions, e.g.,  instead of 
 Allowing attributes for namespaces and enumerators
 New standard attributes ,  and 
 UTF-8 character literals (UTF-8 string literals have existed since C++11; C++17 adds the corresponding character literals for consistency, though as they are restricted to a single byte they can only store "Basic Latin" and C0 control codes, i.e. ASCII)
 Hexadecimal floating-point literals
 Constant evaluation for all non-type template arguments
 Fold expressions, for variadic templates
 A compile-time static  with the form 
 Structured binding declarations, allowing 
copy-initialization and direct-initialization of objects of type  from prvalue expressions of type  (ignoring top-level cv-qualifiers) shall result in no copy or move constructors from the prvalue expression. See copy elision for more information.
 Some extensions on over-aligned memory allocation
 Class template argument deduction (CTAD), introducing constructor deduction guides, e.g. allowing  instead of requiring explicit constructor arguments types  or an additional helper template function .
 Inline variables, which allows the definition of variables in header files without violating the one definition rule. The rules are effectively the same as inline functions
 , allowing the availability of a header to be checked by preprocessor directives
 Value of  changed to 
 Exception specifications were made part of the function type
 Lambda expressions can capture "*this" by value

Library
 Most of Library Fundamentals TS I, including:
std::string_view, a read-only non-owning reference to a character sequence or string-slice
 std::optional, for representing optional objects, a data type that may not always be returned by a given algorithm with support for non-return
 std::any, for holding single values of any type
 std::uncaught_exceptions, as a replacement of std::uncaught_exception in exception handling
 New insertion functions try_emplace and insert_or_assign for std::map and std::unordered_map key-value associative data structures
 Uniform container access: std::size, std::empty and std::data
 Definition of "contiguous iterators"
 A file system library based on boost::filesystem
Parallel versions of STL algorithms
 Additional mathematical special functions, including elliptic integrals and Bessel functions
 std::variant, a tagged union container
 std::byte, allowing char to be replaced for data types intending to model a byte of data as a byte rather than a character
 Logical operator traits: std::conjunction, std::disjunction and std::negation
 <memory_resource> header, for polymorphic memory resources

Removed features
This revision of C++ not only added new features but also removed a few.

 Trigraphs were removed.
 Some deprecated types and functions were removed from the standard library, including std::auto_ptr, std::random_shuffle, and old function adaptors. These were superseded in C++11 by improved facilities such as std::unique_ptr, std::shuffle, std::bind, and lambdas.
 The (formerly deprecated) use of the keyword  as a storage class specifier was removed. This keyword is still reserved but now unused.

Compiler support
 GCC has had complete support for C++17 language features since version 8.
 Clang 5 and later supports all C++17 language features.
 Visual Studio 2017 15.8 (MSVC 19.15) and later supports all C++17 language features.

Library support
 libstdc++ since version 9.1 has complete support for C++17 (8.1 without Parallelism TS and referring to C99 instead of C11) 
 libc++ as of version 9 has partial support for C++17, with the remainder "in progress" 
 Visual Studio 2017 15.8 (MSVC 19.15) Standard Library and later supports all C++17 library features except for "Elementary String Conversions" and referring to C99 instead of C11. "Elementary String Conversions" is added in Visual Studio 2019 16.4

See also
C++ compilers
C11 (C standard revision)
C17 (C standard revision)

References

C++
C++ programming language family
Programming language standards
Articles with example C++ code
IEC standards
ISO standards